Olmedo de Camaces is a village and large municipality in the province of Salamanca,  western Spain, part of the autonomous community of Castile-Leon.

Basic History
Camaces Olmedo, cut across the river which gives its name, honors their patron Saint, George (23 April), with bullfights, as a local tradition.

The township is bordered on the north by a quartzite hill range, bordering on Cerralbo and the former desert of Fuenlabrada.

At the base-line of these hills lie the landscapes of the 'peneplain' and 'charro' field. 
The meadow is oak-lined -and cattle herds of 'Morucha' graze on this meadow.

Geography

See also
 List of municipalities in Salamanca

References

Municipalities in the Province of Salamanca